Frederick Wilhelm Houser (April 15, 1871 – October 12, 1942) was an American attorney who served as an associate justice of the California Supreme Court from October 1, 1937 to October 12, 1942.

Biography
Houser was born to Justus Christian Houser and Martha Rodman in Jones County, Iowa.  He moved to Los Angeles to read law in the offices of Stephen M. White. Houser continued his studies as one of the founding signatures to the University of Southern California Law School, and graduated in the first class of 1900.

In November 1902, Houser was nominated by the Republican Party and was elected an Assemblyman from the 74th district in the California State Assembly.

In November 1906, Houser ran as a Republican and was elected as a Judge in the Los Angeles County Superior Court. In 1911, the Los Angeles trial bench included future Supreme Court justices Frank G. Finlayson, Nathaniel P. Conrey, and Curtis D. Wilbur. In 1912, he was re-elected to a six-year term on the trial bench. In 1916, he was presiding judge of the Superior Court. In 1918, he won another election for a new term on the Superior Court.

In 1923, he became an Associate Justice in the California Court of Appeal, Second District, Division One. He held his seat until 1935 when he was named the Presiding Justice of that Court.

In November 1926, he ran unsuccessfully for the California Supreme Court, losing to Jesse W. Curtis Sr. and William Langdon. From 1935, Houser served as a member of the California Judicial Council.

In 1937, Governor Frank Merriman appointed Houser an associate justice of the California Supreme Court. In November 1938, he was retained in the election. He remained on the high court until his death on October 12, 1942. In December 1942, Governor Culbert Olson appointed B. Rey Schauer to the remainder of Houser's term.

Personal life
At USC, he met his wife, Sara Isabel Wilde, who was also a founding signature for the school.  They had two children, Frederick F. Houser, who became Lt. Governor of California and a judge, and Rodman Wilde Houser.

See also
 List of justices of the Supreme Court of California

Notes

External links
Frederick W. Houser. California Supreme Court Historical Society.
 Frederick W. Houser. California Court of Appeal, Second District.
 Past & Present Justices. California State Courts. Retrieved July 19, 2017.
 Join California Frederick W. Houser
 

1871 births
1942 deaths
People from Jones County, Iowa
Justices of the Supreme Court of California
Judges of the California Courts of Appeal
Superior court judges in the United States
USC Gould School of Law alumni
Lawyers from Los Angeles
20th-century American lawyers
20th-century American judges
Republican Party members of the California State Assembly
20th-century American politicians